Haukur  is an Icelandic masculine given name and may refer to:
Haukur Angantýsson (1948–2012), Icelandic chess Master
Haukur Ingi Guðnason (born 1978) Icelandic footballer 
Haukur Jón Gunnarsson (born 1949), Icelandic theatre instructor and director
Haukur Halldórsson, (born 1937), Icelandic artist 
Haukur Páll Sigurðsson (born 1987), Icelandic international footballer 
Haukur Tómasson (born 1960), Icelandic composer

As a middle name:
Ólafur Haukur Símonarson (born 1947) Icelandic playwright and novelist
Bjarni Haukur Thorsson (born 1971), Icelandic director, writer, producer, and actor

Masculine given names
Icelandic masculine given names